This is a list of notable academic journals published in Slovenia.

A
 Acta Chimica Slovenica
 Acta Geographica Slovenica
 Acta Geotechnica Slovenica
 Acta Histriae
 Ars Mathematica Contemporanea

B
 Bogoslovni vestnik

F
 Filozofski vestnik

G
 Geografski Zbornik

M
 Metodološki zvezki

P
 Prispevki za novejšo zgodovino

S
 Studia Historica Slovenica
 Studia mythologica Slavica

T
 Teorija in praksa

U
 Urbani izziv

Z
 Zgodovinski časopis

External links
 IZUM.si - Slovenske revije v mednarodnih bazah podatkov iz seznama ARRS (2020)

Slovenia
Academic journals, list of